Doolally or Dolally may refer to:

 Deolali, India, the former site of a British Army transit camp
 Deolali transit camp
 Doolally tap or simply "Doolally", meaning to 'lose one's mind', derived from the boredom felt at the camp
 The former name of Shanks & Bigfoot, a British dance-music duo